Chiara Simoneschi-Cortesi (born 21 April 1946) is Swiss politician. A member of the Christian Democratic People's Party (PPD/CVP/PDC), she was elected to the National Council in 1999 and re-elected in 2003 and 2007. Simoneschi was President of the Swiss National Council in 2008/2009.

From 1987 to 1999, Simoneschi was a member of the cantonal parliament of Ticino and its president in 1998/1999.

References

External links
www.chiara-simoneschi.ch

1947 births
Living people
Members of the National Council (Switzerland)
Presidents of the National Council (Switzerland)
Christian Democratic People's Party of Switzerland politicians
Women members of the National Council (Switzerland)
20th-century Swiss women politicians
20th-century Swiss politicians
21st-century Swiss women politicians
21st-century Swiss politicians